SuperFight (2023) was a professional wrestling supercard event produced by Major League Wrestling (MLW), which took place on February 4, 2023, at the 2300 Arena in Philadelphia, Pennsylvania. It was the fourth event under the SuperFight chronology, and a television taping for MLW Fusion. The event also features wrestlers from MLW's partner promotion, Dragon Gate.

Production

Background
On January 9, 2023, MLW announced that it will be holding SuperFight at the 2300 Arena in Philadelphia, Pennsylvania, on February 4, 2023.

Storylines
The supercard will consist of matches that result from scripted storylines, where wrestlers portray villains, heroes, or less distinguishable characters in scripted events that build tension and culminated in a wrestling match or series of matches, with results predetermined by MLW's writers. Storylines are played out on MLW's main show, MLW Fusion , as well as the league's social media platforms.

Per MLW's "Open Door Policy," several independent wrestlers and free agents would be signed to appear at the event. Names include New England-based women's wrestler B3cca. The event will also feature the return of former MLW World Middleweight Champion Lio Rush.

As part of MLW's partnership with Dragon Gate, Open the Dream Gate Champions Natural Vibes (Big Boss Shimizu and Kzy) will defend their titles at SuperFight. Their opponents would be revealed as The FBI (Little Guido and Ray Jaz) on January 26.

At Battle Riot IV, Jacob Fatu last eliminated Real1 to win the titular match, earning a future MLW World Heavyweight Championship match at the time and place of his choosing. A few months later at Fightland, Fatu officially declared that he would challenge for the title, currently held by Alexander Hammerstone - who won the title from Fatu - at SuperFight. Hammerstone would confront Fatu thereafter and accepted his challenge, before the two men got into a pull-apart brawl. The match would be officially announced on MLW's website on January 11, 2023.

On the December 2, 2022 episode of Fusion, Alex Kane revealed he was in possession of the Opera Cup Trophy, which we now know he had stolen from Davey Richards the previous January. A month later at Blood and Thunder, Kane defeated Davey Boy Smith Jr., who accused him of stealing the trophy in the first place.. On January 25, MLW announced that Kane and Smith will wrestle again at SuperFight in a no ropes catch wrestling match.

Results

References

Events in Philadelphia
2023 in professional wrestling
Major League Wrestling shows
February 2023 sports events in the United States
Professional wrestling in Philadelphia